There are four orders in Ghana: Order of the Star of Ghana, Order of the Volta, Medal for Gallantry and Grand Medal.

These were instituted in 1960 as a replacement for the British honours system that was conferred under the Gold Coast and the Dominion of Ghana.

President John Kufuor added a controversial Grand Order of the Star and Eagles of Ghana in June 2008.

Traditional Orders

Order of the Star of Ghana 

Ribbon : tricolor green - yellow - red

 Companion (CSG) - Honorary Division, Civil Division
 Officer (OSG) - Honorary Division, Civil Division, Military Division
 Member (MSG) - Civil Division, Military Division, Police Division, Honorary Division

Order of the Volta 

Ribbon : navy blue with red borders and a central black stripe

 Companion (CV) - Civil Division, Military Division, Honorary Division
 Officer (OV) - Civil Division, Military Division, Honorary Division
 Member (MV) - Civil Division, Military Division, Police Division, Honorary Division

Medal for Gallantry 

Ribbon : central navy blue, with towards the border, a thin red stripe and a broad yellow stripe border.

 Medal for Gallantry (MG)
 Honorary Division
 Civil Division-
 Military Division
 Police Division

Grand Medal 

 Honorary Division
 Civil Division
 Military Division
 Police Division
 Prisons Division

Other Orders 

There are Orders within Ghana also awarded by traditional, constitutionally recognized, subnational Kingdoms.

Kingdom of Godenu 

 Royal Order of the Elephant of Godenu
 Royal Order of the Lion of Godenu

Kingdom of Sefwi Obeng-Mim

Kingdom of Gbi Traditional Area Hohoe 

 Royal and Dynastic Order of the Eagle of Hohoe
 Royal Humanitarian Order of the Kingdom
 Royal Jubilee Medal

Kingdom of Gbi Hohoe-Ahado 

 Royal Order of Merit
 Royal Order of Adziwonor III.

Kingdom of Ashanti Akyem Hwidiem

 Royal Order of the Golden Leopard

Kingdom of New Sawereso-Seinuah
 Royal Order of the Tiger and Hawk

Kingdom of Abura Papagya

 Royal Order of Kwakyen Ababio

See also

National Honours and Awards

References

 Gentleman's Military Interest Club, Rest of the World: Medals & Militaria - Ghana

Ghana and the Commonwealth of Nations
 
Government of Ghana